Francisco Manuel "Fran" González Verjara (born 13 August 1998) is a Spanish footballer who plays for Atlético Madrid B as a central defender.

Club career
González was born in Calonge, Santanyí, Majorca, Balearic Islands, and represented CD Cala d'Or, CF Olímpic de Felanitx, CE Manacor, CD San Francisco and RCD Mallorca as a youth. He made his debut with the latter's reserves on 19 August 2017, starting in a 1–0 home win against CD Binissalem.

González scored his first senior goal on 10 April 2019, netting his team's third in a 3–0 home win against former side Manacor. He made his first team debut on 6 January 2021, starting and scoring an own goal in a 2–2 away draw against CF Fuenlabrada, as his side was knocked out on penalties, for the season's Copa del Rey.

On 13 July 2021, González moved to another reserve team, Atlético Madrid B in Tercera División RFEF.

References

External links

1998 births
Living people
People from Santanyí
Footballers from Mallorca
Spanish footballers
Association football defenders
Tercera División players
Tercera Federación players
RCD Mallorca B players
RCD Mallorca players
Atlético Madrid B players